Moussa Traoré (born 25 December 1971) is an Ivorian former professional footballer who played as a forward.

Career 
Traoré started his career in the Ivory Coast at Rio Sport in Anyama.

In 1987, he won the Golden Shoe award at the FIFA U-17 World Cup.

He moved to France as a teenager to further his playing career in 1990. Later, he became a member of the Ivory Coast team that won the Africa Cup of Nations in 1992. He played in two further continental competitions in 1996 and 1998 for the Elephants. He also featured in an unsuccessful campaign to qualify for the 1994 FIFA World Cup.

References

1971 births
Living people
Footballers from Abidjan
Association football forwards
Stade Rennais F.C. players
Olympique Alès players
Angers SCO players
US Créteil-Lusitanos players
Al-Shabab FC (Riyadh) players
AS Choisy-le-Roi players
La Tamponnaise players
1992 African Cup of Nations players
1996 African Cup of Nations players
1998 African Cup of Nations players
Ivorian footballers
Ivorian expatriate footballers
Ivory Coast international footballers
Africa Cup of Nations-winning players
Expatriate footballers in France
Ivory Coast youth international footballers